St. Matthew's Academy is a Roman Catholic secondary school in the Scottish town of Saltcoats, North Ayrshire.

The teaching facilities in St Matthew's Academy include sports facilities (including a full-size synthetic pitch, an athletics track and a fitness suite), a 400-seat theatre/auditorium and a central social area for pupils.

History
The school first opened on 29 October 2007 following the merger of pupils from St Andrews Academy, Saltcoats and St Michael's Academy, Kilwinning. As of January 2022 the school roll is 1275 thus making it the second largest school in North Ayrshire
 The catchment area of the school encompasses all of North Ayrshire. The most recent inspection from Education Scotland has rated the school as "very good" for Learning, Teaching and Assessment and for Raising Attainment and Achievement.

Associated primaries
The roll of St Matthew's Academy is drawn in the main from the ten cluster denominational primary schools located throughout North Ayrshire: St John Ogilvie's and St Mark's in Irvine; St Winning's and St Luke's in Kilwinning; St John's in Stevenston; St Anthony's in Saltcoats; St Peter's in Ardrossan; St Mary's in Largs; St Bridget's in Kilbirnie; and St Palladius' in Dalry. Pupils from all areas other than Ardrossan, Saltcoats and Stevenston travel to St Matthew's Academy by contract bus.

References

External links
HMI Inspection Report

Catholic secondary schools in North Ayrshire
2007 establishments in Scotland
Educational institutions established in 2007
Ardrossan−Saltcoats−Stevenston
School buildings completed in 2007